Agnes Repplier (April 1, 1855 – December 15, 1950) was an American essayist.

Early years
She was born in Philadelphia in 1855, of French and German extraction, and was educated at the Convent of the Sacred Heart, Eden Hall  at Torresdale, Philadelphia, and later at the Agnes Irwin School. Repplier was reputedly expelled from two schools for "independent behaviour" and illiterate until the age of ten.

Career
Despite her school experiences, she became one of America's chief representatives of the discursive essay, displaying wide reading and apt quotation. Her writings contain literary criticism as well as comments on contemporary life. These characteristics were already apparent in the first essay which she contributed to the Atlantic Monthly (April 1886), entitled “Children, Past and Present.”

Repplier's earliest national publications appeared in 1881 in Catholic World. Although she did write several biographies and some fiction, early in her career she decided to concentrate on essays, and for 50 years she enjoyed a national reputation. She was awarded honorary degrees by the University of Pennsylvania (1902), Notre Dame (1911), Yale (1925), and Columbia University (1927). She was elected as a member to the American Philosophical Society in 1928. Repplier received the Siena Medal from Theta Phi Alpha in 1939.

Personal life
Repplier was a devout Catholic, and had a conservative's outlook on the issues of the day. She was an advocate of feminism and opponent of American neutrality during World War One, though an opponent of radicals and activists. Living and dying in Philadelphia, she also spent time in Europe.

Edward Wagenknecht described her, in 1946, as "our dean of essayists".

Selected works

Philadelphia: The Place and the People (1898)
The Fireside Sphinx (1901)
In Our Convent Days (1905)
The Cat (1912)
Germany and Democracy (1914; with J. William White)
The Promise of the Bell: Christmas in Philadelphia (1924)
To Think of Tea! (1932)
In Pursuit of Laughter (1936) a historical study of types of humor

Essay collections
Books and Men (1888) 
Points of View (1891)
Essays in Miniature (1892)
Essays in Idleness (1893)
In the Dozy Hours and Other Papers (1894)
Varia (1897)
Compromises (1904)
A Happy Half-Century and Other Essays (1908)
Americans and Others (1912) 
Counter-Currents (1916)
Points of Friction (1920) 
Under Dispute (1924)
Times and Tendencies (1931)
Eight Decades: Essays and Episodes (1937)

Biographical studies
J. William White, M.D.: A Biography (1919)
Père Marquette: Priest, Pioneer and Adventurer (1929) (Jacques Marquette)
Mère Marie of the Ursulines: A Study in Adventure (1931) (Marie de l'Incarnation)
Junípero Serra: Pioneer Colonist of California (1933)
Agnes Irwin: A Biography (1934)

Short stories
 "The Last Pages in the Journal of Eve de la Tour d'Arraine," The Catholic World (1882)
 "A Story of Nuremberg," The Catholic World (1884)

Selected articles
 "The Good Humor of the Saints," The Catholic World (1882)
 "An Apostle of Doubt," The Catholic World (1884)
 "Heaven in Recent Fiction," The Catholic World (1885)
 "Falsehood as a Moral Agent," The Catholic World (1885)
 "English Voices on the French Revolution," The Catholic World (1885)
 "English Hymns," The Catholic World (1886)
 "Christmas Carols," The Catholic World (1887)
 "Education," The Atlantic Monthly (1922)

References

Further reading
 Breed, Charles Everett (1994). Agnes Repplier, American Essayist: The force of Character, the Consolation of Civility. Ph.D. diss. University of Michigan.
 Dirda, Michael (2009). American Austen: The Forgotten Writing of Agnes Repplier; see "Michael Dirda on 'American Austen: The Forgotten Writing of Agnes Repplier'," The Washington Post.
 Horchler, Dora (1961). "The Essays of Agnes Repplier," Modern Age, Vol. 5, No. 3, pp. 311–316.
 Lukacs, John (1980). Philadelphia: Patricians and Philistines, 1900–1950. New York: Farrar, Straus, Giroux. 
 Repplier, Emma (1957). Agnes Repplier: A Memoir. Philadelphia: Dorrance and Company.
 Schelling, Felix E. (1922). "Our Miss Repplier." In: Appraisements and Asperities. Philadelphia & London: J.B. Lippincott Company, pp. 21–26.
 Stokes, George Stewart (1949). Agnes Repplier: Lady of Letters. Philadelphia: University of Pennsylvania Press.
 Sweeney, Francis (1951). "Miss Repplier of Philadelphia," The Catholic World, Vol. 173, pp. 278–283.
 Walker, Nancy and Zita Dresner (1988). Redressing the Balance: American Women’s Literary Humor from Colonial Times to the 1980s. Jackson, Miss.: University of Mississippi Press.
 White, James A. (1957). The Era of Good Intentions: A Survey of American Catholics Writing between the Years 1889–1915. Ph.D. diss. University of Notre Dame.

External links

 
 
 
 
 
 Works by Agnes Repplier, at JSTOR
 Essays by Agnes Repplier at Quotidiana.org
 Repplier Biography  at the University of Pennsylvania
 Agnes Repplier, Honored by Edith Wharton But Ignored in Philadelphia
 Philadelphia Sage
 Finding aid to the Agnes Repplier papers at the University of Pennsylvania Libraries

1855 births
1950 deaths
19th-century American women writers
19th-century American writers
19th-century American essayists
20th-century American women writers
20th-century American biographers
American women biographers
American women essayists
Writers from Philadelphia
Catholic poets
Members of the American Philosophical Society
Laetare Medal recipients
Women religious writers
Agnes Irwin School alumni
20th-century American essayists
Members of the American Academy of Arts and Letters